Philippe Poupon, is a French professional offshore yachtsman, born on 23 October 1954 in Quimper, France. He competed 1989–1990 Vendée Globe where he was rescued by Loick Peyron he then went on to finish 3rd in the 1992–1993 Vendée Globe which is the pinnacle solo round the world race. He is one of the most successful sailors with three Figaro wins to his credit, winner of the Ostar, the Route du Rhum, the Route of Discovery, the record of the Atlantic. His early experienced was a crew for Eric Tabarly onboard Pen Duick VI for the :1977–1978 Whitbread Round the World Race. Since 2009 he has embarked on his boat Fleur Australe on an expeditions aimed at raising public awareness of the protection of the oceans.

References

External links 
 Philippe Expedition Website

1954 births
Living people
Sportspeople from Quimper
Volvo Ocean Race sailors
IMOCA 60 class sailors
French male sailors (sport)
Vendée Globe finishers
1989 Vendee Globe sailors
1992 Vendee Globe sailors
French Vendee Globe sailors
Single-handed circumnavigating sailors